Taishanese people, Sze Yup people, or Toisanese (Taishanese: Hlei Yip Gong Ong Ngin) are a Han Chinese group coming from Sze Yup (四邑), which consisted of the four county-level cities of Taishan, Kaiping, Xinhui and Enping. Heshan has since been added to this historic region and the prefecture-level city of Jiangmen administers all five of these county-level cities, which are sometimes informally called Ng Yap. The ancestors of Taishanese people are said to have arrived from central China under a thousand years ago and migrated into Guangdong during the Tang Dynasty. Taishanese, as a dialect of Yue Chinese, has linguistically preserved many characteristics of Middle Chinese.

The Taishanese are part of the Yue Chinese family and have an identity that distinguishes themselves from the dominant Cantonese people. Among the Han Chinese, Taishanese are a source for many famous international Chinese celebrities and have produced the largest numbers of Chinese actors and singers of any region in mainland China. Despite their small population, Taishanese people have also produced a number of famous academics and historical figures. Sze Yup or Jiangmen is considered the home of Chinese Academicians, a title gifted by the world's largest research institution, the Chinese Academy of Sciences. The total of academicians is 31 people, a city with over 20 is considered extremely rare in China.

Among Asian Americans, Taishanese are influential in politics and were the first Americans of Asian descent to be elected as governors (for example Gary Locke), mayors and congressmen. The Taishanese were the first Chinese people to settle in America and the Taishanese language was the original lingua franca of Chinatowns. Taishanese as the lingua franca was later replaced with Cantonese after being overwhelmed by immigration from Guangzhou and its satellite cities when the Chinese Exclusion Act was fully repealed under the Immigration and Nationality Act of 1965. Taishanese American laundrymen and shopkeepers were a primary source of funding that helped launch Dr. Sun Yat-sen's revolutionary activities while he was in exile and raising money from overseas countrymen.

Language and identity
Taishanese is a Yue Chinese language that is distinguished from Standard Cantonese but non-specialists often use "Cantonese" in a broader sense for the entire Yue subgroup of Chinese rather than specifically the language of Guangzhou. Cantonese speakers often find Taishanese difficult to understand and have an average intelligibility of only 30%. This is also true for other Yue Chinese variants such as the Goulou dialects.

Unlike most varieties of Chinese, Cantonese has de facto official status in Hong Kong and Macau and has an independent tradition of the written vernacular. Taishanese, who make up one-third of the population of Hong Kong, may identify themselves with Cantonese instead of Taishanese. Since Hong Kong culture is heavily Cantonese-influenced and is a Cantonese-speaking society, Taishanese and other Han Chinese who are Hong Kong-born and raised, assimilate into the Cantonese identity of Hong Kong. Many Hong Kong activists are of Taishanese ancestry such as the late Szeto Wah who was a politician of the pan-democracy camp and sang democratic Cantonese songs with other activists to promote democracy in China.

Culture

Culturally, Taishanese people are similar to other Yue Chinese peoples. Today, many Sze Yup people have become successful in many areas such as the entertainment industry, business and politics. Hong Kongers of Sze Yup ancestry include: Andy Lau, Beyond (band), Danny Chan, Kenny Kwan, Joey Yung, Ronnie Chan, John Tsang, Andrew Li and many others. The Father of Hong Kong Cinema, Lai Man-Wai also has ancestry from the Sze Yup region of province. As a result, Sze Yup people have dominated in the entertainment industry and play most major roles in the music and movie sectors. In many films, Taishanese can be heard, especially in many of Karl Maka's films such as Merry Christmas and Aces Go Places.

It is said that over a hundred famous people come from the Sze Yup region of Guangdong Province, making the region famous for producing more stars than any other city/region in mainland China. As a result, the local government in Jiangmen which administers the Sze Yup or Ng Yap cities of Taishan, Kaiping, Enping, Xinhui and Heshan, decided to build a Stars Park called Jiangmen star park.

Taishan county is famous for being the Birthplace of China's volleyball, that was brought to Taishan by Overseas Chinese and the city won many provincial and national championships. Taishanese are well known for their love for Volleyball and being China's champions. Premier Zhou En-Lai once stated, "Taishan is Half of the Country's (China)  System."

Architecture

In 2007, UNESCO named the Kaiping Diaolou and Villages in China as a World Heritage Site. UNESCO wrote, "...the Diaolou … display a complex and flamboyant fusion of Eastern and Western structural and decorative forms. They reflect the significant role of émigré Kaiping people in the development of several countries in South Asia, Australasia, and North America, during the late 19th and early 20th centuries, and the close links between overseas Kaiping and their ancestral homes. The property inscribed here consists of four groups of Diaolou, totaling some 1,800 tower houses in their village settings." Today, approximately 1,833 diaolou remain standing in Kaiping and approximately 500 in Taishan. Although the diaolou served mainly as protection against forays by bandits, a few of them also served as living quarters. Kaiping has traditionally been a region of major emigration abroad and a melting pot of ideas and trends brought back from Overseas Chinese. As a result, many diaolou incorporate architectural features from China and from the West. Tong Laus which are mixed-used buildings where the ground floor is reserved for commercial use and the top floors for residential are also prominent in the region, as are traditional Lingnan architecture aesthetics which are commonly found throughout Guangdong Province.

Economy and business
Besides dominating the entertainment industry, they are quite dominant and influential in Hong Kong's Business Industry, founding such companies as the Bank of East Asia, Lee Kum Kee, Hang Lung Properties, Maxim's Catering, Li & Fung, Beijing Air Catering Ltd, Hysan Development and many others. Lui Che-woo once the second richest man in Asia.
 	
Famous overseas Taishanese businessmen includes Loke Yew, the richest man of Malaysia in his time and who made significant impact in the growth of Kuala Lumpur and was one of founder fathers of Victoria institution. Jack Yan who founded his company Lucire, is a magazine publisher in New Zealand and he also owns a software firm that created over 100 typeface designs himself for the firm and inspired other local typeface designers such as Kris Sowersby to pursue careers in that industry. Norman Kwong who is the lieutenant governor of Alberta, is also president and manager of Calgary Stampeders a Canadian football league.

Academics
Sze Yup or Jiangmen is considered the home of Chinese Academician town: The total of academicians is 31 people, a town with over 20 is considered extremely rare in China.

Wu Lien-teh – First Han Chinese and Malaysian Chinese to be nominated for a Nobel prize in physiology or Medicine, Chu Ching-wu – Selected as the Best Researcher in the U.S. by U.S. News & World Report in 1990., GUO Jing-Kun – pioneer and one of academic leaders in the field of Materials Research
Nancy Ip – member of the Chinese Academy of Sciences and the World Academy of Sciences., Vivian Wing-Wah Yam – she was a 2011 L'Oréal-UNESCO Awards for Women in Science laureate "for her work on light-emitting materials and innovative ways of capturing solar energy.
Huan Yong – China's modern plant taxonomy founder, Chen Haozhu – Career in medicine for many years, has won the national, military science and technology progress award more than 20 other awards
Albert Chan (professor) – a Hong Kong professor of chemistry and traditional Chinese medicine.
Huang Cuifen one of the founders, successive Chinese Academy of Military Medical Institute of Basic Medical researcher
Liang Sili – Chinese Engineer. Chief Designer of inertial guidance platforms for Chinese ballistic missiles.
Chen Guoda – Expertise in Mechanical Engineering
Huang Benli – Chinese Academy of Sciences, Xiamen University, Professor, Huang has won many awards: 2 2nd-class Major Science and Technology Achievements Awards of Chinese Academy of Science
Zhangyou Qi – Computational mechanics, civil engineering experts
Xue Shepu – Researcher in cell proliferation and differentiation
Huan Yong – Is one of the founders of modern science of plant classification. His lifelong hard work, rigorous scholarship on China Plant Science has made outstanding contributions.
Li Chunxuan – Aerospace aircraft design, high-speed collision mechanics specialist.
Chen Hao Zhu – Medical experts in cardiovascular disease. member of China Engineering Academy.
TANG Zhao – Former director of the International Union Against Cancer
Cai Ruixian – Received the Chinese Academy of Science and Technology Progress Award, Chinese Academy of Natural Science Award
I Guocong – Former China Engineering Thermophysics director, China Power Engineering Society executive director; China Energy Research Association executive director.
Kuang Yu Ping – 1989 was awarded the First Prize in Physics Wu Xun, 2003 was elected to the Academy of Mathematics and Physics Academy of Sciences.
Henry NC Wong – University of London and then to Harvard University postdoctoral research.
Albert Chan – An organic chemist, Chinese Academy of Sciences.
Huang Cuifen – University of London and then to Harvard University postdoctoral research.
Li Shaozhen – improve cataract surgery quality in the introduction of technology and innovation
Huangyao Xiang – Zhongshan University Department of Physics.
Chen Yong-Su – Research on a new target of cancer chemotherapy drugs and biochemical modulation
Maisong Wei – 1965–1969 any Associate Professor University of Western Ontario in Canada.
Ye Danian – 1991 was elected to the Chinese Academy of Sciences Division of Earth Sciences and in 2001 as Peking University professor of Earth and Space Sciences.
Feng Peide – well-known experts in the field of aviation.

Overseas

Because the history of going abroad is long and there are many people sojourning widely in various districts, Taishan is called the "No.1 Homeland of Overseas Chinese". The Taishanese diaspora is distributed in 91 countries and regions of the five continents including US, Canada, Hong Kong, Colombia, Cuba, Mexico, Malaysia and Singapore.

Taishanese have had a large influence in the course of Asian-American history, as they were the first Asian Americans to be elected as Governors, Mayors and U.S congressmen in the continental United States. The first international celebrity of Asian descent and America's first ace in World War II. They also represented the largest Asian community in America and made a significant contribution in building the First transcontinental railroad of United States. The  Central Pacific Railroad (CPRR) is the former name of the railroad network built between California and Utah that formed part of the "First Transcontinental Railroad" in North America. About 12,000 such emigrant workers were employed as laborers by the Central Pacific Railroad representing 90 percent of the entire work force. J. O. Wilder, a Central Pacific-Southern Pacific employee, commented that “The Chinese were as steady, hard-working a set of men as could be found. With the exception of a few whites at the west end of Tunnel No. 6, the laboring force was entirely composed of Chinamen with white foremen. A single Irish foreman with a gang of 30 to 40 Chinese men generally constituted the force at work at each end of a tunnel; of these, 12 to 15 worked on the heading and the rest on the bottom removing material. When a gang was small or the men needed elsewhere, the bottoms were worked with fewer men or stopped so as to keep the headings going.” The laborers usually worked three shifts of 8 hours each per day, while the foremen worked in two shifts of 12 hours each, managing the laborers.

The Sun Ning Railway (AKA Sunning Railway and Xinning Railway) 新寧鐵路 (Pinyin: Xinning Tielu) was a standard-gauge railway in the Pearl River Delta in Guangdong Province founded in 1906 by a man of Taishanese origin Chin Gee Hee 陳宜禧 (Pinyin: Chen Yixi) and Yu Shek 余灼 (Pinyin: Yu Zhuo). It was South China's second railway and one of only three railways in pre-1949 China built solely with private Chinese capital.

Notable Taishanese people

Lai Man-Wai (Xinhui, Guangdong) – Father of Hong Kong cinema
Feng Ru (Enping, Guangdong) – Father of Chinese Aviation
Liang Sicheng (Xinhui, Guangdong) – Father of Modern Chinese Architecture
Hu Die (Heshan, Guangdong) – Empress of Chinese Cinema
Chen Yunchang (Taishan, Guangdong) – Very Famous Shanghainese Actress and is the "3rd Empress of Chinese Movie" who starred some popular movies including "Mulan Joins the Army" in 1939.
Lee Ya-Ching (Enping, Guangdong) – China's First Lady of Flight
Dai AiLian (Xinhui, Guangdong) – Mother of Chinese Dance "中国舞蹈之母".
Lily Leung (Xinhui, Guangdong) – Hong Kong's First TV Actress. She acted in the first-ever TV drama series produced in Hong Kong
Lau Kar-leung (Xinhui, Guangdong), China – is a Hong Kong-based Chinese actor, filmmaker, choreographer and martial artist. Lau is best known for the films he made in the 1970s and 1980s for the Shaw Brothers Studio. 
Shawn Yue (Taishan, Guangdong) – is a famous Hong Kong actor, Singer and former model
Joey Yung (Xinhui, Guangdong) – is a Cantopop singer and actress from Hong Kong
Andy Lau (Xinhui, Guangdong) – is a Hong Kong Cantopop singer, film actor and producer; one of the Four Heavenly Kings of Cantopop
Tony Leung Chiu-Wai (Taishan, Guangdong) – is a Cannes Film Festival and five-time Hong Kong Film Award-winning Chinese film and television actor
Danny Chan (Taishan, Guangdong) – Very popular Hong Kong actor, singer and songwriter; his hometown is Sijiu, Taishan.
Hung Sin-nui (Kaiping, Guangdong) – a national treasure level Cantonese opera master and movie actress in China and Hong Kong
Kenny Kwan (Kaiping, Guangdong) – Hong Kong actor and singer; former member of Hong Kong boy band Boy'z
Gillian Chung (Xinhui, Guangdong) – Hong Kong actress and singer; a member of Hong Kong music group Twins
Beyond (band) (Taishan, Guangdong) – The most famous Hong Kong rock band; all of its band members have Taishanese ancestry. The band became the first band from Hong Kong to have a multinational fan base, being popular in Japan, Malaysia, Taiwan, Singapore, China.
Karl Maka (Taishan, Guangdong) – is a popular Hong Kong producer, director, actor and presenter; his hometown is Chonglou, Taishan.
Donnie Yen (Taishan, Guangdong) – is a Hong Kong martial artist, actor, film director, action choreographer and film producer
Alfred Cheung (Kaiping, Guangdong) – Chinese actor, director, writer and producer
Raymond Wong (film presenter) (Heshan, Guangdong) – Hong Kong actor, film director, producer, screenwriter and presenter
Ekin Cheng (Enping, Guangdong) – is a Hong Kong actor and Cantopop singer
Kenny Bee (Xinhui, Guangdong) – is a Hong Kong singer, musician and actor; a member of the Hong Kong English pop and Cantopop band the Wynners
Alan Tam (Xinhui, Guangdong) – is a Hong Kong Cantopop and English pop singer and actor
Kenny Ho (Enping, Guangdong) – is a Hong Kong and Taiwanese actor
Hacken Lee (Xinhui, Guangdong) – is a Hong Kong based Cantopop singer and lyricist, actor, Master of Ceremonies and Association football sportscaster
Tiffany Lam (Xinhui, Guangdong)the former Hong Kong TVB female artistes, won the 2002 Miss Hong Kong winner and 2003 Miss Chinese International runner-up. His cousin Liu Qianting for the year 2009 Miss Hong Kong winner
Justin Lo (Kaiping, Guangdong) – American singer-songwriter, actor and record producer working in Hong Kong.
George Lam (Xinhui, Guangdong) – is a Hong Kong-based veteran Cantopop singer and actor 
Gigi Lai (Xinhui, Guangdong) – is a Hong Kong actress and singer.
Bobby Au-Yeung (Xinhui, Guangdong) – is a Hong Kong actor best known for his comedic roles in many TVB television dramas.
Adam Cheng (Taishan, Guangdong) – is a Hong Kong TVB actor and Cantopop singer; husband of Lydia Shum
Joyce Cheng (Taishan, Guangdong) – is a Hong Kong musician, writer, actor and performer. She is the daughter of famous Hong Kong comedian Lydia Shum and veteran actor Adam Cheng.
Chapman To (Taishan, Guangdong) – is a Hong Kong actor, best known for specializing in comedic roles in films such as Infernal Affairs and Initial D.
Jaime Chik (Kaiping, Guangdong) – is a Hong Kong TVB actress. She is married to Michael Miu.
William So (Xinhui, Guangdong) – is a Hong Kong Cantopop singer
Stephanie Cheng (Enping, Guangdong) – is a Hong Kong Cantopop singer
Edmond Leung (Taishan, Guangdong) – Hong Kong singer-songwriter, record producer, actor, TV host
Wong He (Taishan, Guangdong) – is a Hong Kong Chinese Actor and Model and former Hong Kong Policeman
Myolie Wu (Taishan, Guangdong) – Hong Kong actress and singer
Ti Lung (Xinhui, Guangdong) – Hong Kong actor known for his martial roles and gangster
Maggie Cheung Ho-yee (Taishan, Guangdong) – Hong Kong actress
Bosco Wong (Jiangmen, Guangdong) – is a Hong Kong actor under TVB management and singer under East Asia Music.
Gigi Leung (Xinhui, Guangdong) – is a Hong Kong singer and actress
Moses Chan (Taishan, Guangdong) – Hong Kong actor
Michelle Yim (Xinhui, Guangdong) – Hong Kong actress
Deep Ng (Xinhui, Guangdong) – Hong Kong Actor, singer and songwriter
Christine Ng (Taishan, Guangdong) – Hong Kong actress
Flora Chan (Taishan, Guangdong) – Hong Kong actress
Pakho Chau (Kaiping, Guangdong) – Hong Kong singer
David Li (Heshan, Guangdong) – Chairman and Chief Executive of the Bank of East Asia; his grand father founded the Bank
Ronnie Chan (Taishan, Guangdong) – One of the top 10 HK Billionaire; he is the chairman of Hang Lung Group and Hang Lung Properties
Victor Fung (Heshan, Guangdong) – is the Group Chairman of Li & Fung group of companies; his grand father founded the company
Lee Hysan (Xinhui, Guangdong) – was a renowned land developer and entrepreneur in Hong Kong who founded modern-day Hysan Development Company Limited. He was known as the Li Ka-shing or the wealthiest man in HK in the early 20th century.
Dr.James Tak Wu (Taishan, Guangdong) – founder of Maxim's Catering; which is Hong Kong's largest food & beverage corporation and restaurant chain
Annie Wu Suk-ching (Taishan, Guangdong) – is a Hong Kong-based Chinese businesswoman and activist who founded Beijing Air Catering Ltd, the first joint venture company in the People's Republic of China; she is the daughter of Dr. James Tak Wu.

Artists
Alan Chin – San Francisco Bay Area contemporary artist
Tyrus Wong – painter, muralist, ceramicist, lithographer, designer and kite maker
James Hong –  former president of the Association of Asian/Pacific American Artists (AAPAA)

Actors
Brandon Soo Hoo, Chinese American actor
Kevin Han Yee, Chinese American actor
Hayden Szeto, A Chinese Canadian actor 
Jason Yee, Actor, director, Won numerous martial arts championships and became the first American to medal at the First World San-Shou Free-Fighting Championship.

Business
Kwong Sue Duk – A merchant in Australia, respected and influential amongst the Chinese and European communities
Wong Ah Fook – A builder of many famous Johor heritage buildings
Chin Gee Hee – A labor contractor and railway entrepreneur who contributed railway workers for American railway project.
Jack Yan – He founded Lucire a fashion magazine publisher in New Zealand.
James Tak Wu – founder of Hong Kong's famous Maxim's Catering Limited, which is Hong Kong's largest food & beverage corporation and restaurant chain. His ancestral town is Sijiu.
Robert H. Lee – Vancouver-based businessman, investor and philanthropist
Loke Wan Tho – founder of Cathay Organisation in Singapore and Malaysia
David Li – The Honourable Sir David Kwok Po Li is the current Chairman and Chief Executive of the Bank of East Asia, and a former member of the Legislative Council of Hong Kong and the Executive Council of Hong Kong.
Thomas Tam – a Hong Kong-born Canadian businessman
Annie Wu Suk-ching – founder of Beijing Air Catering Ltd and member of the Standing Committee of the National Committee of Chinese People's Political Consultative Conference. She is the daughter of James Tak Wu.
Qiu Liben selected by the netizens in China as one of the Top 100 Public Intellectuals in 2006 and 2008. 
Milton Wong – Canadian banker and philanthropist 
Lui Che Woo -* once the second richest man in Asia, is a billionaire businessman who developed multi-national conglomerate involving properties, entertainment & leisure, construction materials and hotels with over 200 subsidiaries and more than 20,000 employees in Hong Kong, Mainland China, Macau, North America and Southeast Asia. In May 2011, Galaxy Entertainment Group Limited has opened $2 billion Galaxy casino and hotel in Macau with 2,200 rooms, 50 restaurants, 450 gambling tables, an artificial beach and a wave pool.
Yip Hon – A Macau tyconn with estimated wealth of 100 million
Yip Sang – was a prominent Canadian businessman, whose business and family flourished during the period when Chinese Canadians faced discrimination and restrictions.
Sir Lee Quo-wei – was a prominent Hong Kong businessman who served as the director of Hang Seng Bank and Chinese University of Hong Kong. He was awarded a Grand Bauhinia Medal in 1997.

Athletes
 Norman Kwong – Lieutenant-Governor of Alberta & professional football player, president & manager of the Calgary Stampeders. He was one of very few of his contemporaries to be voted one of the Canadian Football League's Top 50 players of the sport's modern era by Canadian sports network TSN.
 Wan Chi-keung was a known as "Asia's top striker". Wan was a key player for the Hong Kong national football team in the 1970s and 1980s. Played for South China and Japan club seiko. After retired, he became an actor.
 Yi Jianlian is a 7 ft tall Chinese basketball player; he played for NBA, Milwaukee Bucks, New Jersey Nets, and Washington Wizards.
 Tam Kong-pak – who represented the Republic of China national team during the 1936 summer Olympics.
 He Jianbin – His mother Guohua Ying was backstroke national record holder, also represent China in the Los Angeles Olympic Games. He is a Chinese swimmer. At the 2012 Summer Olympics he finished 21st overall
 Yu Zhuocheng – Yu won a silver medal in the 3 metre springboard diving at the 1996 Summer Olympic Games
 Guan Weizhen – She is the only woman to have won three consecutive women's doubles titles at the BWF World Championships. She also won a silver medal in 1996 Olympics Barcelona. She's also part of the team that won Uber Cup (women's international) teams that won world championships at this biennial event.
 Rong Zhi Xing was Nicknamed: "Asian Pele", "New Chinese Football King".
 Chen Xiaomin – Chinese retired weightlifter, in 2000 Sydney Olympics on the women's 63 kg weightlifting gold medal, also a world and Asian champion
 Richard Tom was a Chinese American weightlifter and Olympic medalist. He earned silver medal at the 1947 World Championships and bronze medal at the 1948 Summer Olympics in London
 Kim Ng – executive in Major League Baseball. She is currently the Senior Vice-President for Baseball Operations with Major League Baseball.
 Tan Sixin She is a gymnastic youth champion, east Asian champion and national champion. She was also a bronze medal world champion

Education
 Wu Lien-teh – First Han Chinese and Malaysian Chinese to be nominated for a Nobel prize in physiology or Medicine
 Chu Ching-wu – Selected as the Best Researcher in the U.S. by U.S. News & World Report in 1990.
 Li Enliang – Chinese civil engineer and educator.
 Chin Siu Dek – (AKA Jimmy H. Woo) – martial artist of Sanba and a Grandmaster of Kung Fu San Soo.
 William Poy Lee – San Francisco author who wrote The Eighth Promise.  book won the 2007 PEN Oakland/Josephine Miles Literary Award for outstanding and original contribution to multicultural literature. 
 Ken Hom – Chinese American chef, author and British television-show presenter. In 2009 he was awarded by Queen Elizabeth II with an honorary OBE for ‘services to culinary arts’.
 Betty Kwan Chinn – won the 2008 Minerva Award.U.S. President Barack Obama awarded her and 12 others the Presidential Citizens Medal on August 4, 2010 at the White House[2]
 Wing-tsit Chan – was one of the world's leading scholars of Chinese philosophy and religion, active in the United States. Chan was the author of A Source Book in Chinese Philosophy, one of the most influential sources in the field of Asian studies, and of hundreds of books and articles in both English and Chinese on Chinese philosophy and religion. He was a leading translator of Chinese philosophical texts into English in the 20th century
 Maxine Hong Kingston – Chinese American author known for writing The Woman Warrior and other books in the genre of Chinese American literature. Her parents were from Xinhui, Guangdong.
 Liu Junxian – Mathematician, director of China Mathematical Society.

Historical
 Liang Qichao – scholar, journalist, philosopher and reformist and was called Mind of Modern China
 Kang Youwei – prominent politician and Leader Gongche Shangshu movement who influenced Guangxu Emperor and Chinese politicians
 Tang Shaoyi – first prime minister of the Republic of China
 Wu Tingfang – first ethnic Chinese barrister, diplomat and politician who served as Minister of Foreign Affairs
 Loke Yew the richest man of Malaysia in his time and made significant impact in the growth of Kuala Lumpur, and was one of founder fathers of Victoria institution.
 Anna May Wong – the first Asian & Chinese American to become international movie star and the first Asian-American to be minted in U.S. Currency.
 Chen Yunchang – a very famous Shanghainese actress. She starred some popular movies including Mulan Joins the Army. She is the 3rd "Chinese Film Queen"; while the 1st is Hu Die who is also of Sze Yup origin.
 Gary Locke – the first person of Chinese American/Asian descent to become a governor within the continental United States. He was also the first known person of Chinese heritage to serve as the Commerce Secretary of the US.
 James Wong Howe – master cinematographer of Hollywood.
 Arthur Chin – America's first ace in World War II.
 Raymond Kwok Chow (A.K.A. Shrimp Boy) – San Francisco Chinatown mobster, Dragon Head of the San Francisco Chapter Chinese Freemasons
 Judy Chu She is the first Chinese American woman ever elected to the U.S. Congress. Chu was reelected in the 2010 United States midterm elections, defeating Republican challenger Edward "Ed" Schmerling.
 Michael Woo He served as the first Asian American on the Los Angeles City Council from 1985 to 1993. Woo chaired the Citywide Planning commission, until 1993 when he became the first Asian American to run for the mayor of a major city.
 Szeto Wah – He is the first Chinese and first person from Asia to have received a Homo Homini Award. He is regarded as one of the most influential Hong Kong politicians of pan-democracy movement and is respected by many pro-democracy citizens from China and Hong Kong.
 Alexander Yee – calculated World Record digits of Pi.
 Chen Baisha – One of China most famous Confucian scholars, poets, and calligraphers, during the Ming Dynasty
 Chan Heung – Is one of the martial arts legend of China and founder of the Choy Li Fut that became one of China's most popular fighting system.
 Jeong Yim – He is Chan Heung best student, and is recognized as an important contributor to the expansion of Choy Li Fut.  His life is filled with heroism, myths, stories and legends and was a significant influential character in the novels of anti-Qing organizations.
 Kwan Tak-hing – Is In total he made over 130 films. No one else in cinema history has portrayed the same person as many times he did.
 Chin Siu Dek (Jimmy H. Woo) – the man responsible for bringing Kung Fu San Soo

Politicians
 Fernando Chui The Chief executive of Macau
 Fernando Cheung – a HK politician the vice-chairman of the Labour Party, was also a physician and head of an Asian rights organization in San Francisco.
 Wu Chaoshu – became Foreign Affairs Minister and served as Minister to the United States from 1928 to 1931,
 Wen Tsung-yao – Deputy president of Tibet, and a Politician and diplomat of Qing.
 Mei Quong Tart –  A prominent businessman, activist and philanthropist who had a significant impact against anti-Chinese sentiment in Australia
 John Tsang – Financial Secretary of Hong Kong.
 Evan Low – the youngest Asian American mayor in the United States.
 Leland Yee – California State Senator. In 2004 Yee became the first Asian American to be appointed Speaker pro Tempore.
 Margaret Chin – New York City-based American politician. A Democrat, she was elected to the New York City Council (First elected to this position) on November 3, 2009, to represent District 1 in Lower Manhattan.
 Bill Lann Lee – United States Assistant Attorney General for Civil Rights, Clinton Administration.
 Chaovarat Chanweerakul – Acting prime minister of Thailand and cabinet minister
 Julius Chan – former Prime Minister of Papua New Guinea of An Nan Jiang Chao village in Doushan.
 Matt Fong (A.K.A. Matt Kwong) (1953–2011) – former Treasurer of the State of California.
 Wong Kim Ark – defendant in United States v. Wong Kim Ark, 169 U.S. 649 (1898).
 Fernando Cheung a HK politician the vice-chairman of the Labour Party, was also a physician and head of an Asian rights organization in San Francisco.
 Patrick Yu – Hong Kong lawyer and Crown Counsel, and founder of its first law school.
 Inky Mark –  is a Canadian politician and a former member of the Canadian House of Commons and is also a member of the Conservative Party of Canada.
 Yu Hung-Chun – Political figure who served as premier of the Republic of China on Taiwan between 1954 and 1958.
 Wu Shih-wen – was the Minister of National Defense of the Republic of China in 2000–2002.
 Art Lee – Lee was elected to the Canadian House of Commons as a candidate of the Liberal Party of Canada to represent the electoral district of Vancouver East.  From 1984 to 1987, he served as the leader of the British Columbia Liberal Party.
 Liang Xiang – representative in the fifth, sixth, and seventh National People's Congresses.
 Delbert E. Wong – was the first Chinese American judge in the continental United States.
 Adrienne Clarkson is Chinese of Irish and Portuguese descent -Born to a Taishanese father and Hakka mother, she is the Honourable as a former Governor General of Canada,

Others
 Leung Ying – mass murderer that killed 7 Taishanese Wong family members.
 Victims of Leung Ying's mass killings.

See also
Taishanese

References

Siyi

Cantonese people